Lankagama is a small town in Sri Lanka. It is located within Southern Province.

See also
List of towns in Southern Province, Sri Lanka
it is basically included 4 villages Pitadeniya,Kolonthotuwa,Wathugala, and Lankagama.

External links

Populated places in Southern Province, Sri Lanka